Richardsson is a Swedish patronymic surname meaning "son of Richard". Notable people with the surname include:

Daniel Richardsson (born 1982), Swedish cross-country skier
Per-Olov Richardsson (born 1942), Swedish alpine skier
Richard Richardsson (snowboarder) (born 1974), Swedish snowboarder
Richard Richardsson (footballer) (born 1979), Swedish footballer

See also
Richardson (surname)
 Tony Rickardsson

Swedish-language surnames
Patronymic surnames
Surnames from given names